The 2010–11 Liga Alef season saw Maccabi Umm al-Fahm (champions of the North Division) and Hapoel Jerusalem (champions of the South Division) win the title and promotion to Liga Leumit.

At the bottom, the bottom two clubs in each division, Maccabi Kafr Qara, Hapoel Ramot Menashe Megiddo (from North division), Hapoel Tzafririm Holon and Shimshon Bnei Tayibe (from South division) were all automatically relegated to Liga Bet, whilst the two clubs ranked in 14th place in each division, Ironi Sayid Umm al-Fahm and Hapoel Nahlat Yehuda entered a promotion/relegation play-offs, and both relegated to Liga Bet after losing the play-offs.

Changes from last season

Format changes
 The clubs placed 2nd to 5th in each division would participate in a promotion play-offs, a knockout tournament. In the first round, in each division the 2nd placed club would play the 5th placed club and the 3rd placed club would play the 4th placed club. In the second round, the two first round winners would play each other. In the first two rounds the higher ranked club would have home advantage. In the third round both divisional play-off winner would play each other in a neutral venue for a place in a promotion/relegation play-off against the 14th placed club in Liga Leumit, which would be played over two home and away matches.

Team changes
 Maccabi Ironi Jatt and Hapoel Herzliya were promoted to Liga Leumit; Hapoel Jerusalem and Hapoel Marmorek (both to South division) were relegated from Liga Leumit.
 Hapoel Hadera was transferred from South division to North division.
 Hapoel Bnei Jadeidi, Hapoel Bnei Tamra and Maccabi Tirat HaCarmel were relegated to Liga Bet from North division; Ahi Acre, Hapoel Daliyat al-Karmel and Hapoel Ramot Menashe Megiddo were promoted to the North division from Liga Bet.
 Beitar Kfar Saba and Hapoel Mevaseret Zion were relegated to Liga Bet from South division; Maccabi Kabilio Jaffa and Bnei Eilat were promoted to the South division from Liga Bet.

North Division

South Division

Promotion play-offs

First round
Second and third placed clubs played single match at home against the fourth and fifth placed clubs in their respective regional division.

Hapoel Asi Gilboa and Hapoel Afula (from North division) and Maccabi Kiryat Malakhi and Maccabi Kabilio Jaffa (from South division) advanced to the second round.

Second round
The winners of the first round played single match at home of the higher ranked club (from each regional division).

Hapoel Asi Gilboa and Maccabi Kabilio Jaffa advanced to the third round.

Third round
Hapoel Asi Gilboa and Maccabi Kabilio Jaffa faced each other for a single match in neutral venue. the winner advanced to the fourth round against the 14th placed club in Liga Leumit.

Maccabi Kabilio Jaffa advanced to the fourth round.

Fourth round
Maccabi Kabilio Jaffa faced the 14th placed in 2010–11 Liga Leumit Hakoah Ramat Gan. the winner on aggregate earned a spot in the 2011–12 Liga Leumit. The matches took place on May 26 and 31, 2011.

Hakoah Ramat Gan won 3–2 on aggregate and remained in Liga Leumit. Maccabi Kabilio Jaffa remained in Liga Alef.

Relegation play-offs

North play-off
The 14th placed club in Liga Alef North, Ironi Sayid Umm al-Fahm, faced the Liga Bet play-offs winner, F.C. Givat Olga. the winner earned a spot in the 2011–12 Liga Alef.

Ironi Sayid Umm al-Fahm relegated to Liga Bet.

South play-off
The 14th placed club in Liga Alef South, Hapoel Nahlat Yehuda, faced the Liga Bet play-offs winner, Ortodoxim Lod. the winner earned a spot in the 2011–12 Liga Alef.

Hapoel Nahlat Yehuda relegated to Liga Bet.

References
Liga Alef North 2010/2011 The Israel Football Association 
Liga Alef South 2010/2011 The Israel Football Association 

Liga Alef seasons
3
Israel